Tralles was a city of ancient Caria, now occupied by Aydın, Turkey.

Tralles may also refer to:
Tralles (crater), a crater on the Moon
Tralles (diocese), a Roman Catholic diocese
Tralles (Lydia), a town of ancient Lydia
Tralles (Phrygia), a town of ancient Phrygia
Tralles (Thracian tribe), an ancient Thracian tribe